The Democratic Socialist Party was a political party in Guinea-Bissau.

History
The party first contested national elections in 2004, when it ran in the parliamentary elections that year. It received 2% of the vote, but failed to win a seat. In the 2008 elections its vote share fell to 0.4% and it remained without representation in the National People's Assembly.

References

Defunct political parties in Guinea-Bissau
Democratic socialist parties in Africa
Political parties with year of disestablishment missing
Political parties with year of establishment missing